Epicephala flagellata is a moth of the family Gracillariidae. It is known from Sri Lanka.

References

Epicephala
Moths described in 1908